The WBNS TV Tower is a  tall free-standing lattice tower with a triangular cross section used by WBNS-TV in Columbus, Ohio.

The tower's height was either later increased or a new tower was built in 1955–1956, at which point it became the second tallest lattice tower in the United States after the WTVR TV Tower which had been built two years prior in 1953. The tower remains to this day the tallest free-standing structure in Columbus, Ohio and one of the tallest in the country. In 1981, WBNS-TV and WBNS-FM broadcast were switched over to an even taller guyed candelabra tower located directly adjacent to the WNBS Tower standing  in height. WCMH-TV and most of Columbus' FM radio stations also broadcast from the candelabra tower.

See also
 Lattice tower
 List of famous transmission sites

References

Lattice towers
Radio masts and towers in Ohio
Towers completed in 1949
Buildings and structures in Columbus, Ohio